Purushottam Lal Kaushik (24 September 1930 – 5 October 2017) was an Indian Politician.

Details
He was elected to the Lok Sabha the lower house of the Indian Parliament from Raipur in 1977 and Durg in 1989 from Madhya Pradesh as a member of the Janata Dal. He was the Minister for Tourism and Civil Aviation in the Morarji Desai ministry and later Minister of Information and Broadcasting in the Charan Singh ministry

References

External links 
 Official biographical sketch on the Parliament of India website

1930 births
2017 deaths
India MPs 1977–1979
India MPs 1989–1991
Janata Dal politicians
Chhattisgarh politicians
Civil aviation ministers of India
Tourism ministers of India
Ministers for Information and Broadcasting of India
Lok Sabha members from Madhya Pradesh
Politicians from Raipur